Cochinita pibil (also puerco pibil or cochinita con achiote) is a traditional Yucatec Mayan slow-roasted pork dish from the Yucatán Peninsula. Preparation of traditional cochinita involves marinating the meat in strongly acidic citrus juice, adding annatto seed, which imparts a vivid burnt orange color, and roasting the meat in a píib while it is wrapped in banana leaf.

Methods

Cochinita means baby pig, so true cochinita pibil involves roasting a whole suckling pig. Alternatively, pork shoulder (butt roast), or pork loin is used in many recipes. The high acid content of the marinade and the slow cooking time tenderizes the meat, allowing otherwise tough pieces of meat to be used.  The Yucatecan recipes always employ the juice of Seville or bitter oranges for marinating. In areas where bitter oranges are not common, juice of sweet oranges combined with lemons, limes, or vinegar are employed to approximate the effect of the bitter orange on the meat. Another important ingredient in all pibil recipes is achiote (annatto), which gives the dish its characteristic color and adds to flavor.
It is usually eaten with side dishes such as: yellow corn tortillas, red pickled onion, refried black beans and habanero chilies. 
Traditionally, cochinita pibil is buried in a pit with a fire at the bottom to roast it.

In popular culture
Cochinita pibil is a recurring element of the movie Once Upon a Time in Mexico, directed by Robert Rodriguez, in which it is the favorite food of a CIA agent played by Johnny Depp.

See also
Barbacoa
Birria
Carnitas
Pulled pork
Lechón asado
 List of Mexican dishes
 List of pork dishes
Pozole

References

External links

Cochinita Pibil Recipe [English]

Cuisine of Yucatán
Pork dishes
Citrus dishes
Mexican pork dishes